Clarence Franklin Currie (December 30, 1878 – July 15, 1941), was a Canadian professional baseball player who played pitcher in the Major Leagues in –. He played for the St. Louis Cardinals, Cincinnati Reds, and Chicago Cubs.

External links

1878 births
1941 deaths
Canadian expatriate baseball players in the United States
Sportspeople from Windsor, Ontario
Major League Baseball pitchers
St. Louis Cardinals players
Cincinnati Reds players
Chicago Cubs players
Baseball people from Ontario
Toronto Maple Leafs (International League) players
Buffalo Bisons (minor league) players
Major League Baseball players from Canada
Burials in Wisconsin
People from Little Chute, Wisconsin